Baywood can refer to a place in the United States:

 Baywood, Louisiana
 Baywood, New York
 Baywood (Pittsburgh), a Pittsburgh Landmark

Baywood can also refer to:
 Wood from a Bay tree (disambiguation)